Liber physiognomiae (The Book of Physiognomy) is a work by the Scottish mathematician, philosopher, and scholar Michael Scot concerning physiognomy; the work is also the final book of a trilogy known as the Liber introductorius. The Liber physiognomiae itself is divided into three sections, which deal with various concepts like procreation, generation, dream interpretation, and physiognomy proper.

The information found in the Liber physiognomiae seems to have been derived largely from Arabic copies of Aristotelian and Pseudo-Aristotelian works. The work was written in the early 13th century for Frederick II, the Holy Roman Emperor. It was first printed in 1477. Liber physiognomiae would go on to be very popular, and would be reprinted many times. Scot's work had a major influence on physiognomy itself, and heavily affected how it would be approached and applied in the future.

Background 

Liber physiognomiae was written by the Scottish mathematician Michael Scot (AD 1175 – c. 1232) and is the final entry in a divination-centered trilogy, collectively titled the Liber introductorius (The Great Introductory Book). This trilogy also includes the Liber quatuor distinctionum (The Book of the Four Distinctions) and the Liber particularis (The Singular Book).

Contents 

Liber physiognomiae, as the title suggests, concerns physiognomy, or a technique by which a person's character or personality is deduced based on their outer appearance. Scot refers to this as a "doctrine of salvation" (Phisionomia est doctrina salutis), as it easily allows one to determine if a person is virtuous or evil. The book is relatively short, comprising about sixty octavo pages. The work is usually divided into around one hundred chapters, with the number of chapters and their divisions differing greatly depending on what manuscript is being consulted.

While the chapter headings vary across manuscripts, scholars are in agreement that the work is made up of three distinct sections. The first of these deals with the concepts of procreation and generation, largely according to the doctrines of Aristotle and Galen. This section opens by stressing the important influence of the stars before it deals with topics concerning human sexual intercourse. The book then moves onto the topics of conception and birth, and the author then explores the physical signs of pregnancy. The final two chapters of this section deal with animals; the penultimate chapter focuses on "animals in genere et in specie" (i.e. in regards to genus and species), while the final details an idiosyncratic system for differentiating the various types of animals.

The second section begins to focus specifically on physiognomy, considering different organs and body regions that index the "character and faculties" of individuals. Early chapters in this portion of the book are written in a medical style, and they detail signs in regards to "temperate and healthy bod[ies] ... repletion of bad humours and excess of blood, cholera, phlegm, and melancholy", before turning to particular sections of the body. Several following chapters discuss dreams and their meanings. Scot argues that dreams are: true or false; represent past, present, or future events; or are entirely meaningless. The second section comes to an end with chapters concerning auguries and sneezes, respectively.

The third and final section covers body parts, and explicates what the characteristics of these portions may reveal about the nature of the person in question. The final chapter in this section warns the would-be physiognomist to withhold judgement based solely on one part of their body, but rather to "tend always to a general judgement based on the majority of all [the person's] members." This is because another part which has not been consulted may readily counter a conclusion suggested by a part that has. Scot also argues that a physiognomist should take into account a person's "age, long residence in one place, long social usage, excessive prevalence of the humours of his complexion beyond what is customary, accidental sickness, violence, accidents contrary to nature, and a defect of one of the five natural senses."

Sources 

According to the physiognomy scholar Martin Porter, the Liber physiognomiae is a "distinctly Aristotelian" compendium of "the more Arabic influenced 'medical' aspects of natural philosophy." Indeed, it seems likely that Scot made use of several Aristotelian and Pseudo-Aristotelian works in the writing of the Liber physiognomiae, many of which were derived from Arabic copies. The first of these is an Arabic translation of the Historia Animalium. The second is the Kitāb Sirr al-Asrār (known in Latin as the Secreta Secretorum), an Arabic text that purports to be a letter from Aristotle to his student Alexander the Great on a range of topics, including physiognomy. The third of these works is Physiognomonics, also attributed to Aristotle and, as the title suggests, also about physiognomy; the influence of this Pseudo-Aristotelian work, according to Haskins, is "limited to the preface" of the Liber physiognomiae. Scot probably used the original Greek version of Physiognomonics to write his book. The historian Charles Homer Haskins argues that the Liber physiognomiae also "makes free use" of Muhammad ibn Zakariya al-Razi (also known as Rhazes) and shows "some affinities" with Trotula texts and writers of the Schola Medica Salernitana (a medical school located in the Italian town of Salerno).

Publication history and popularity 

The work was written sometime in the early 13th century, and is explicitly dedicated to Frederick II. The scholar James Wood Brown argues that the book was likely written for the soon-to-be Holy Roman Emperor Frederick II in AD 1209 on the occasion of his wedding to Constance of Aragon. Brown also adds, "No date suits this publication so well as 1209, and nothing but the urgent desire of Court and people that the marriage should prove fruitful can explain, one might add excuse, some passages of almost fescennine license which it contains." The philosophy and religion scholar Irven Resnick argues that the work was given to Frederick so that "the emperor [might be able] to distinguish, from outward appearances, trustworthy and wise counselors from their opposite numbers."

While manuscripts of the Liber quatuor distinctionum and the Liber particularis exist, the Liber physiognomiae was the only book from the Liber introductorius trilogy to be professionally printed, with a first print of the book being released in 1477. Between the date of its official printing and 1660, the work was reprinted eighteen times in many languages; this popularity of the text led Rudolf Hirsch (a book scholar) in 1950 to call the book one of the Middle Ages' "best sellers". The number of reprints and its wide circulation is attributed in large part to the advent of the printing press in 1440. Among the many reprints, there is little evidence of textual changes, which is unique for manuscripts published and then transmitted in the fifteenth century.

The Liber physiognomiae was often bundled with other, topically-similar texts. For instance, some copies of Scot's book were combined with a work by pseudo-Albertus Magnus entitled De secretis mulierum (Concerning the Secrets of Women), which, according to the Dictionary of National Biography, suggests the opinion of the time was that Scot "dealt with forbidden subjects, or at least subjects better left to medical science." Extracts from the Liber physiognomiae also appear in many early printed versions of Johannes de Ketham's medical treatise Fasciculus Medicinae (although this is not the case for all early copies). Finally, in 1515 a compendium titled Phisionomia Aristotellis, cum commanto Micaelis Scoti was published, which featured the Liber physiognomiae of Scot, alongside physiognomical works by Aristotle and Bartolomeo della Rocca.

Impact

According to Porter, Scot's Liber physiognomiae was influential for three main reasons: First, Scot developed a number of physiognomical aphorisms. Given the popularity of the Liber physiognomiae, Scot's new formulations and ideas, according to Porter, "introduce[d] some fundamental changes into the structure and nature of the physiognomical aphorism." (Effectively, what Scot did was add new meanings to various physical features, making the physiognomical signs discussed in the Liber physiognomiae more complex and, as Porter writes, "polyvalent.") Second, Scot developed a "stronger conceptual link between physiognomy, issues of hereditary, embryology, and generation, which he articulated through astrological ideas of conception." Porter argues that this was done because the book was written by Scot to help Frederick II pick a suitable wife (and thus, by extension, produce a suitable heir). Third and finally, Scot's Liber physiognomiae seems to be the first physiognomical work that takes smell into account. According to Porter, this "totalization" of physiognomythat is, connecting it to a variety of subjects like reproduction and sense perceptionwas the most dramatic change that occurred in the way that physiognomy was practiced "as it developed in the period between classical Athens and late fifteenth-century Europe".

Footnotes

References

Sources 

 
 
 
  
  
  
  
 
 
  
   
 
 
 
 
 
 

Academic works about philosophy
Physiognomy